In mathematics, computer science and logic, overlap, as a property of the reduction rules in term rewriting system, describes a situation where a number of different reduction rules specify potentially contradictory ways of reducing a reducible expression, also known as a redex, within a term.

More precisely, if a number of different reduction rules share function symbols on the left-hand side, overlap can occur. Often we do not consider trivial overlap with a redex and itself.

Examples

Consider the term rewriting system defined by the following reduction rules:
 
 

The term   can be reduced via ρ1 to yield , but it can also be reduced via ρ2 to yield . Note how the redex   is contained in the redex .

Overlap may occur with fewer than two reduction rules.

Consider the term rewriting system defined by the following reduction rule:
 
The term  has overlapping redexes, which can be either applied to the innermost occurrence or to the outermost occurrence of the  term.

References

Rewriting systems